The National Institute of Geophysics and Volcanology (INGV) is a research institute for geophysics and volcanology in Italy.

INGV is funded by the Italian Ministry of Education, Universities and Research. Its main responsibilities within the Italian civil protection system are the maintenance and monitoring of the national networks for seismic and volcanic phenomena, together with outreach and educational activities for the Italian population. The institute employs around 2000 people distributed between the headquarters in Rome and the other sections in Milan, Bologna, Pisa, Naples, Catania and Palermo.

INGV is amongst the top 20 research institutions in terms of scientific publications production. It participates and coordinates several EU research projects and organizes international scientific meetings in collaboration with other institutions.

Presidents 

September 29, 1999  – August 11, 2011: 
August 12, 2011 – December 21, 2011: 
March 21, 2012 -April 27, 2016 :  (since December 21, 2011 acting president)
 April 28, 2016 – present: .

References

External links 
 Official Website

Geophysics organizations
Scientific organisations based in Italy
Volcano monitoring